Argenis may refer to:
 Argenis, a book by John Barclay
 Argenis (bug), a genus of insects in the tribe Mirini
 Argenis (wrestler), a professional wrestler